Patrice Kindl (born 1951 in Alplaus, New York) is an American novelist.  She won the 1995  Mythopoeic Fantasy Award, Children's Fiction, for the novel Owl in Love.

Awards
 1995,  Mythopoeic Fantasy Award, Children's Fiction, Owl in Love

Bibliography 
Owl in Love (1993)
The Woman in the Wall (1997)
Goose Chase (2001)
Lost in the Labyrinth (2002)
Keeping the Castle (2012)
A School for Brides: A Story of Maidens, Mystery and Matrimony (2015)

References

External links 
 
 Rising Star feature at The Bulletin of the Center for Children's Books
 Interview at Quill Inc.
 
 

1951 births
20th-century American novelists
21st-century American novelists
American children's writers
American fantasy writers
American women novelists
Living people
American women children's writers
Women science fiction and fantasy writers
20th-century American women writers
21st-century American women writers